The Anand–Godhra section belongs to  division of Western Railway zone in Gujarat State.

History

Anand-Dakor branch was opened in 1874. The length of Anand-Dakor branch was 29 km. Dakor-Rukhyal and Rukhyal-Angadi branch was opened in 1875 and 1876 respectively. The total length of Dakor-Angadi branch was 15 km. 27 km Sevalia-Godhra branch was opened in 1882.

The branch of Anand-Thasra and Thasra-Godhra was electrified in 1983 and 1984 respectively.

Doubling 

Doubling of Anand–Godhra section was sanctioned in 2017-2018. Foundation stone of Anand–Godhra section was laid in 2019. The length of Anand–Godhra section is 79 km.

References

5 ft 6 in gauge railways in India
Railway lines in Gujarat